is a Japanese rower. He competed at the 1964 Summer Olympics, 1968 Summer Olympics and the 1972 Summer Olympics.

References

1942 births
Living people
Japanese male rowers
Olympic rowers of Japan
Rowers at the 1964 Summer Olympics
Rowers at the 1968 Summer Olympics
Rowers at the 1972 Summer Olympics
Place of birth missing (living people)